Kay Adshead (born 10 May 1954) is a poet, playwright, theatremaker, actress and producer.

Early life and education 
Adshead was born in Cheetham Hill, Manchester, moving to Stretford where she was educated at Stretford Girls’ Grammar. She was a child actress with the Stretford Children’s Theatre. She trained as an actress at RADA, where she won the Emile Littler award for outstanding talent and the Bryan Mosley award for individual skill in stage-fighting. She graduated in 1975.

Career
She has played leading roles in film and TV, including Cathy in the BBC classic series Wuthering Heights, Beryl Stapleton in Hound of The Baskervilles, Linda in Mike Leigh’s BBC TV film Kiss of Death, and Sue McKenna in the Film on Four Acceptable Levels.

Theatre performances include Moll Gromer in Thee and Me and Muriel in Harlequinade at the Royal National Theatre. She was Betty in Touched and sang the role of Clara Twain in White Suit Blues at The Old Vic, both directed by Sir Richard Eyre. She was Constanze in the nationwide tour of Amadeus with Keith Michell for Triumph Apollo Productions.  She played Eve, Zoo, Savvy and Newly-Born in Cambridge Theatre Company’s production of Back To Methusalah culminating at the Shaw Theatre. She was Tanzi in Trafford Tanzi at the Mermaid Theatre, learning to wrestle for the role, and Liz in Juicy Bits in the main house at the Lyric Hammersmith.

In the 1980s and 1990s, Kay Adshead appeared in lead roles in fringe and experimental theatre productions and had several guest appearances in television programmes including The Bill, Dick Turpin, Victoria Wood: As Seen on TV, Over To Pam, an episode of Victoria Wood's sitcom dinnerladies, A Bit of Fry and Laurie, an early episode of One Foot in the Grave, Mother’s Ruin, and Family Affairs.

She has also played leading roles in regional and repertory companies, including playing Viola in Twelfth Night at Nottingham Playhouse, with Tim Piggott-Smith as Orsino and Anthony Sher as Malvolio. She was Sissy in People Are Living There with Margaret Tyzack at the Royal Exchange, Manchester, Diaphanta in The Changeling, and Avril in Semi-Detached at the Bristol Old Vic with Pete Postlethwaite. She was Judith in Herod at The Sheffield Crucible, Josie in Steaming at the Harrogate Theatre, singing the role of Mrs Johnson in Blood Brothers at The Swan Theatre, Worcester, and Gila in Not Quite Jerusalem at the Liverpool Playhouse.

Adshead has directed plays including On the Verge by Eric Overmyer at The Man in The Moon, The Possibilities by Howard Barker, Fen by Caryl Churchill and Entertaining Strangers by David Edgar, all at The Lyric Hammersmith Studio. She has written and directed Bones at The Bush,  The Singing Stones at The Arcola and Acts of Defiance at Theatre503. She devised and directed The Enquiry and The London Summer (two shorts) and If Anyone Recognises These Young People, all at the Roundhouse studio.

Mama Quilla theatre company
In 1999, with Lucinda Gane, she cofounded theatre company Mama Quilla. Mama Quilla has produced The Bogus Woman at the Traverse and the Bush, Bites at the Bush Theatre and Bones at the Haymarket, Leicester, and the Bush. The Bogus Woman, Bites and Bones were also produced internationally and all have been published by Oberon Books.

Filmography

Film

Television

Playwright credits
Her credits as a playwright include:
 The Still Born – 1983 – Soho Theatre
 Thatcher's Women – 1987 Paines Plough / Tricycle Theatre – Susan Smith Blackburn Prize finalist 1987-88
 After the Party – 1987 – Altered States Theatre Company / Liverpool Playhouse / Young Vic (part of Fears and Miseries of the Third Term)
 Metal and Feathers – 1988 – Cockpit Theatre (part of Small Objects of Desire)
 Ravings: Dreamings – 1993 – Library Theatre, Manchester
 The Slug Sabbatical – 1995 – The Red Room Theatre Company / Calouste Gulbenkian Award Bursary for performance poetry
 Bacillus – 1996 – The Red Room Theatre Company following rehearsed readings at the Cockpit Theatre and the Hampstead Theatre
 Juicy Bits – 1998 – Main House, Lyric, Hammersmith
 Bogus People's Poem – 2000 – The Red Room Theatre Company / BAC
 The Bogus Woman – 2000–2001 – The Red Room Theatre Company and Mama Quilla Productions / Traverse Theatre / Bush Theatre (2000 Fringe First from The Scotsman): Susan Smith Blackburn Prize finalist 2001–02
 The Snow Egg – 2001 – Play for Children Tiebreak Theatre tour
 Lady Chill, Lady Wad, Lady Lurv, Lady God – 2001–2002 – National Theatre, part of Shell Connections
 Animal – 2003 – Soho Theatre, National Tour
 Bites – 2005 – Mama Quilla Productions / Bush Theatre - Susan Smith Blackburn Prize finalist 2005-06
 Bones – 2006 – Bush Theatre
 Bones – 2007 – Calypso Productions, Dublin, and La Compagnie Yorick, Paris
 Others – 2008 – LAMDA Long Project
 Stuffed – 2008 – Mama Quilla Productions / Broadway Theatre, Barking 
 Five Crimes Reconstructed – 2009 – Mama Quilla Productions / Broadway Theatre, Barking 
 Possessed – 2009 – Soho Theatre (part of Everything Must Go) 
 Three Police Statements Taken from Working Girls – 2010 – Mama Quilla Productions with English Collective of Prostitutes and City Lit 
 To Dismember – 2010 –  John Lyons Theatre 
 Protozoa – 2010 – The Red Room Theatre Company / Jellyfish Theatre
 Sweet Papaya Gold – 2010 – Mama Quilla Productions / Broadway Theatre, Barking 
 Boys Talking – 2010 – Mama Quilla Productions / Broadway Theatre, Barking 
 The Last Little Girl – 2011 – La Compagnie Yorick / Theatre Vitry at Cine Robespierre, Paris
 If Anyone Recognises These Young People – 2011 – Mama Quilla Productions / Broadway Theatre, Barking 
 Breaking – 2011 – John Lyons Theatre 
 From the Streets of Revolution – 2012 – Roundhouse 
 Matter – 2012 – Mama Quilla Productions / Broadway Theatre, Barking 
 F.O.M.O. – 2013 – Mama Quilla Productions / Broadway Theatre, Barking 
 I Am Sad You Are Dead Mrs. T. – 2013 – Theatre503 
 Happy Ending – 2013 – Natural Shocks (part of PEEP), Edinburgh Festival 
 Veil – 2014 – Mama Quilla Productions, small tour / The Alchemy Festival, South Bank 
 The Singing Stones – 2015 – Mama Quilla Productions / the Arcola 
 Primrose, Entering Incomplete Map Data Area, Three Lotus Flowers for Acts of Defiance – 2015 – Mama Quilla Productions / Theatre503

Awards 
Susan Smith Blackburn Prize finalist three times for Thatcher’s Women, The Bogus Woman and Bites, respectively
 Edinburgh Festival 2000 Fringe First for The Bogus Woman
 Manchester Evening News Best Fringe Performer for Noma Dumezweni in The Bogus Woman at the Royal Exchange, Manchester
 The Bogus Woman performed by Noma Dumezweni nominated for E.M.M.A. (Ethnic Minority in Media Award)
Adelaide Fringe Festival 2006 Best Play of Fringe and Fringe Sensation for The Bogus Woman performed by Sarah Niles
 Nominated for Encore magazine best play of the year for Animal at the Soho theatre

References

External links
 

English women dramatists and playwrights
English television actresses
1954 births
Living people
English women poets
20th-century English actresses
20th-century English writers
21st-century English actresses
21st-century English writers
20th-century English women writers
21st-century English women writers
People educated at Stretford Grammar School
Alumni of RADA